Elthorne Park may refer to:

 Elthorne Park, London Borough of Ealing. See Hanwell #Elthorne Park.
 Elthorne Park, London Borough of Islington. See Islington parks and open spaces.